El Cortez or El Cortez Hotel may refer to:

Places
 El Cortez (Las Vegas), also known as El Cortez Hotel and Casino, in Las Vegas, Nevada, opened in 1941 and listed on the National Register of Historic Places (NRHP)
 El Cortez (Reno), also known as El Cortez Hotel, in Reno, Nevada, opened in 1931, NRHP-listed
 El Cortez (San Diego), also known as El Cortez Hotel, a former hotel in San Diego, California, NRHP-listed

Other
El Cortez (film), a film released in 2006, starring Lou Diamond Phillips